Jaco van Schalkwyk (born 13 September 1979) is a former South African rugby union player and currently a coach at the Future Kings.

During his spell there, he played Super Rugby for the Cats, as well as playing for the South Africa sevens team in 2003 to 2004.

References

South African rugby union coaches
South African rugby union players
Living people
1979 births
Golden Lions players
Lions (United Rugby Championship) players
Eastern Province Elephants players
Western Province (rugby union) players
Free State Cheetahs players
South Africa international rugby sevens players